Hyundai Fomex is a specialized photo and broadcasting equipment company in Korea. Hyundai Trading Company was established in May 1992, and it was converted into a corporation in 1996 with the name of Hyundai Fomex. Fomex has been leading the development of the Korea video industry by quickly responding to changes in the industrial environment and focusing on technology development by instituting Digital Business Unit at Hongik University in 2002. 
In 2010, Fomex established R&D center for broadcasting equipment industry advancement, and expanded exporting to North America, Japan, Europe, Asia and South America by participating in top international fairs. In addition, Fomex consecutively has been recognized as a representative company in Asia by winning the VIP ASIA Awards in 2013 for the best products (Fomex E Studio Flash) and for the best product of the year in 2014. In 2015, Fomex was designated as a Hi-Seoul brand enterprise in the green field of Seoul City. In recognition of its growth potential and innovation, selected as a Small Giant Company of Korea in 2018, and has grown up as a global leader.

History

July 2018
 Selected as Small Giant Company of Korea
July 2017
 Selected as the 1st place in Korea customer satisfaction
Feb 2017
 Selected as an excellence exporting company in 2016
Jan 2017
 Selected as the best product award of Hi Seoul (photo, broadcasting LED lighting)
Nov 2016
 Launched FLEXIBLE LED broadcast lighting
Nov 2015
 VIP Asia Awards 2015 selected as one of the Top 100 Brands in Asia
March 2015
 Signed a university-industry cooperation agreement with Chung-Ang University
Jan 29, 2015
 Designated as a Hi-Seoul brand enterprise in Seoul
December 12, 2014
 Awarded as the best electronic trading company certification by Korea IT Industry Promotion Agency
Nov 2014
 VIP ASIA 2014 Awarded Best Product in Asia IT Industry
Nov 2013
 VIP ASIA 2013 Awarded Best Product in Asia IT Electronics Industry
2013
 Released FOMEX E Flash
Oct 2012
 Established R & D Center
2010
 Selected as an export promising small and medium enterprise
Feb 2009
 Released DR.RAY 2.4 GHz Tuner
Feb 2009
 Launched N-LIGHT, the electrodeless light for photography and video
2009 - 2010
 VIP ASIA 2009 ~ 2010 H1 Selection
2008
 Designated as Innobiz 'Technological Innovation type SME' company in technology innovation
 Selected as a venture company certified enterprise
April 2006
 Launched FOMEX D STUDIO FLASH
2005
 Selected as a quality excellent company in Korea (media company)
Aug 2005
 Released CRICKET FLASH
1992
 Released digital STUDIO FLASH
1992
 Established Hyundai Corporation
 Launched Digital Studio Flash for the first time in Korea

Certification
 Selected as Small Giant Company of Korea
Selected as Hi-Seoul Brand in Korea
 Selected as an excellent company in Seoul
 Innobiz 'Technological Innovation type SME'
ISO 9001/14001
 CE/KC Certification

Products

LED Lights

Flexible LED FL600/FL1200

The Flexible LED 600 is a revolutionary LED light that can be freely transformed. It is easily stored and easily carried anywhere you go. The daylight and tungsten option are available and have a lot of differentiated technologies such as colorimetric purity. The high-quality LED panel has a power output of up to 2,000 lux per meter and a digital dimmer that is controllable from 0 to 100%. With its delicate light diffusion, waterproof rated IP64, and no hint of flicker, it is very ideal for high quality video production which meets the mega trend of green, smart, and convergence of technology.

Based on powerful output and delicate light diffusing options, it dramatically increases the color temperature of 6500K and provides the luminous intensity of 4000 lux while maintaining the flexibleness. Revolutionizing the lighting market, the FOMEX Flexible LED is a true hybrid technology that provides the best performance indoors and outdoors, making it a compact system for every task. It is lightweight, has a small radius of curvature, and is thin enough to meet demanding requirements regardless of where you use.

EX Panel Light EX600/EX1200/EX1800

Fomex EX Panel Light, which is based on FOMEX 's original technology, has been awarded as a product of the year in the category of LED lighting in VIP ASIA Awards 2014. Fomex EX Panel Light has the adjustable color temperature from 2700K to 6500K and TLCI 98 & CRI 96Ra producing stable and soft light.

Fomex EX Panel Light is easy to carry and designed to be compatible with accessories such as Barndoors and SoftBox.

Strobe Lighting

D prop

The Fomex D series is a consumer's favorite high-end digital strobe. The sophisticated Fomex Dp incorporates the Prop function, which allows you to apply the same amount of brightness to the modeling as the brightness set on the strobe.
It also uses a high-quality capacitor with a digital user interface (UI) and proven reliability, and a high-performance flash tube. It achieves crisp, detailed light even in repeated work and maintains a rich amount of light.

E / G Series
The E series has improved user experience(UI) based on stability and color reproducibility. The function of the finder and jog-dial allows adjusting quick light intensity. It is included with 'overcharge warning' on LED lamp that is easily detachable.
The G600 is a high-speed continuous shooting strobe suitable for shooting at high speeds. Duration Time is 1/8,000 and can be possible to produce thirty shots per second.

Light Modifiers

Peri Bounce

The 'PERI BOUNCE' series is a photographic aid that is able to reflect light or adjust the amount of light to be reflected on the main light when taking photographs. It is suitable for outdoor photography when used as an aid to support as a secondary. The Peri Bounce structure is designed to improve the shooting environment. It is made of a circular frame made of aluminum material, which makes it light in weight. It also increases the strength and provides rigidity without bending or breaking. By inserting an elastic cord in the pipe, it is easy and quick to assemble and disassemble without loss. In addition, the volume is minimized during disassembly and can be stored in the carrier bag, which makes it easy to move and store. The fabric of various colors (FRAME RELECTOR: 5, REFLECTOR: 6) including the diffuser can be selected according to shooting conditions.

Exhibition 
2017: IBC (Amsterdam)
2016: PHOTOKINA (Cologne)
2016: IBC (Amsterdam)
2015: IBC (Amsterdam) 
2014: PHOTOKINA (Cologne) 
2012: PHOTOKINA  (Cologne) NAB SHOW (Las Vegas) 
2010: PHOTOKINA  (cologne) PHOTONEXT  Fair (Tokyo) 
2009: PIZ  Fair (Tokyo) PHOTO WORLD-Dubai  (Dubai) PMA  (Las Vegas) 
2008: PHOTOKINA  (Cologne)  
2007: TAORMINA  (Italy)  SONIMAG FOTO  (Barcelona) PHOTO SHOW Milano  (Milano) PIE  (Tokyo) PMA  (Las Vegas) 
2006: PIE  (Tokyo) PHOTOKINA  (Cologne) 
2004: P&E  (Guangzhou) 
2002: PHOTOKINA  (Cologne)
2000: PHOTOKINA  (Cologne)
1998: PHOTOKINA  (Cologne)
1997: IPPF  (Tokyo) P&E  (Beijing) 
1996: PMA  (Las Vegas)

References

 Ranked #1, 'Korea Customer Satisfaction 2017'
 Present Fomex LED light “Hi-Seoul Excellent Product” in KOBA  
 Hyundai Fomex, Awarded “Export Excellence Company”
 Hyundai Fomex, Released Digital Strobe Fomex Dp 
 Hyundai Fomex, Released New Digital Strobe 
 [2014 Product of the Year] Hyundai Fomex EX1200 LED light, Awarded LED Videography Light
 Hyundai Fomex, Launched ‘PERI BOUNCE Series’ Highly Utilized for Outdoor Shooting

External links
 Hyundai Fomex Official Website
 Facebook
 Instagram
 Youtube

Companies based in Seoul
Companies established in 1996
Photography companies of South Korea
Photographic lighting
Flash photography
South Korean brands